Difluorophosphoric acid is an inorganic compound with the formula HPO2F2.  It is a colorless liquid. The acid has limited applications, in part because it is thermally and hydrolytically unstable.

It is prepared by hydrolysis of phosphorus oxyfluoride:
POF3 + H2O → HPO2F2 + HF
Further hydrolysis gives monofluorophosphoric acid:
HPO2F2 + H2O → H2PO3F + HF

Complete hydrolysis gives phosphoric acid:
H2PO3F + H2O → H3PO4 + HF

The salts of difluorophosphoric acid are known as difluorophosphates.

References

Oxohalides
Phosphorus halides
Fluoro complexes